Antimonials, in pre-modern medicine, were remedies principally containing antimony, used chiefly for emetic purposes. They might also have qualified for cathartic, diaphoretic, or simply alternative uses. Such treatments were considered unparalleled in their strength.

Metaphorical usage

The following passage illustrates the use of the word antimonial to mean emetic in common (as well as medical) terms:

See also 

Antimony pill
Antimonial cup
Pentavalent antimonial

External links
 
Antimonials.

See also
Antimonial cup
Pentavalent antimonial

References

Emetics
Antimony